Simon David Hoggart (26 May 1946 – 5 January 2014) was an English journalist and broadcaster. He wrote on politics for The Guardian, and on wine for The Spectator. Until 2006 he presented The News Quiz on BBC Radio 4. His journalism sketches have been published in a series of books.

Personal life
Simon Hoggart was born on 26 May 1946 in Ashton-under-Lyne, Lancashire, and educated at Hymers College in Kingston upon Hull, Wyggeston Boys' School in Leicester, and then King's College, Cambridge, where he excelled at history and English. He was the son of the literary scholar and sociologist Richard Hoggart, and Mary Holt Hoggart. His brother is the Times television critic Paul Hoggart. He lived in South London with his wife, Alyson, a clinical psychologist, and their two children, Amy and Richard. He was diagnosed with terminal pancreatic cancer in mid-2010 and died of the disease at Royal Marsden Hospital on 5 January 2014.

Career
Hoggart joined The Guardian in 1968, later becoming the American correspondent for The Observer, and occasional guest commentator on National Public Radio's Weekend Edition Saturday. Having written on politics for some years in Punch magazine, Hoggart became the Parliamentary sketch writer for The Guardian in 1993. He also wrote a wine column for The Spectator. Hoggart's sketchwriting prowess was still admired into the 2010s – Total Politics note that in 2011 Hoggart had "been a regular tormenter of the prime minister," (David Cameron) "especially on the sensitive issue of the PM's bald patch, which Hoggart compared to "a goujon of plaice" from Marks and Spencer."

In the early 1980s he chaired the radio comedy show The News Quiz, returning to the show in 1996 for another ten years. In March 2006, Hoggart presented his last edition of The News Quiz commenting: "I'm getting a bit clapped out and jaded, and I think that's beginning to show."

In 1998 he was part of BBC Radio 4's 5-part political satire programme Cartoons, Lampoons and Buffoons. He was also a contributor to the Grumpy Old Men and wrote for Punch magazine and an occasional column for New Humanist magazine (last entry May 2005). Hoggart was also an occasional celebrity panellist on BBC2's antiques quiz show Going, Going, Gone.

His published books form an eclectic list, including debunking the supernatural, anecdotes about Parliament, a biography, his thoughts about the United States, a serious political review and collected Christmas round-robin letters. He coined the phrase "the law of the ridiculous reverse", "which states that if the opposite of a statement is plainly absurd, it was not worth making in the first place".

When speculation appeared in the News of the World in December 2004 suggesting he was the "third man" in the Kimberly Quinn affair, Hoggart initially denied any involvement before issuing a statement admitting that he had an extra-marital affair with Quinn before her own marriage. The political sex scandal involving Quinn contributed to the resignation of David Blunkett from the Cabinet.

Works

Books
Simon Hoggart, House of Fun, Guardian Books (2012) , parliamentary sketches
Simon Hoggart, Send Up the Clowns, Guardian Books (17 October 2011) 
Simon Hoggart, A Long Lunch: My Stories and I'm Sticking to Them John Murray (14 October 2010) 
Simon Hoggart, Life's Too Short to Drink Bad Wine Quadrille Publishing Ltd (18 September 2009) 
Simon Hoggart, The Hands of History: Parliamentary Sketches 1997–2007 (2007) 
Simon Hoggart and Emily Monk, Don't Tell Mum: Hair-raising Messages Home from Gap-year Travellers by  Atlantic Books (27 December 2006) 
Simon Hoggart, The Hamster That Loved Puccini: The Seven Modern Sins of Christmas Round-Robin Letters (2005) 
Simon Hoggart, The Cat That Could Open the Fridge: A Curmudgeon's Guide to Christmas Round-Robin Letters (2004) 
Simon Hoggart, Punchlines: A Crash Course in English with John Prescott (2003) , on Prescottese language
Simon Hoggart, Playing to the Gallery: Parliamentary Sketches from Blair Year Zero (2002) , parliamentary sketches
Simon Hoggart and Steve Bell, Live Briefs: A Political Sketch Book (1996) , parliamentary sketches, with the Guardian political cartoonist
Simon Hoggart, House of Correction (1995) , parliamentary sketches
Simon Hoggart and Mike Hutchinson, Bizarre Beliefs (1995) , on "the human desire to believe the unbelievable"
Simon Hoggart, America: A User's Guide (1991) , on his experiences living in the United States
Simon Hoggart (editor), House of Cards: A Selection of Modern Political Humour (1988) 
Simon Hoggart, House of Ill Fame (1985) , parliamentary sketches
Simon Hoggart, Back On the House (1982) , parliamentary sketches
Simon Hoggart, On the House: The Personalities and the Politics From the Irreverent "Punch" Column (1981) , parliamentary sketches
Simon Hoggart and David Leigh, Michael Foot: A Portrait (1981) , biography of politician Michael Foot
Simon Hoggart and Alistair Michie,The Pact: The Inside Story of the Lib-Lab Government, 1977-8 (1978) 
Bryan McAllister and Simon Hoggart, Little Boxes: A Selection of Bryan McAllister Cartoons From "The Guardian" (1977)

Audiobooks
The News Quiz: The First 25 Years (BBC Radio Collection) (2003) 
Simon Hoggart's Pick of "The News Quiz": Vol 2 (2002) 
Simon Hoggart's Pick of "The News Quiz": Vol 1 (2000)

References

External links

Column archive at The Guardian
Simon Hoggart's week parliamentary sketch series at The Guardian
Column archive at the New Humanist
The News Quiz at BBC Radio 4

5 minutes with Simon Hoggart on Hot Dinners

1946 births
2014 deaths
20th-century British journalists
20th-century English male writers
21st-century British journalists
21st-century English male writers
Alumni of King's College, Cambridge
BBC Radio 4 presenters
Deaths from cancer in England
Deaths from pancreatic cancer
English male journalists
English radio personalities
Simon
People educated at Hymers College
People educated at Wyggeston Grammar School for Boys
People from Ashton-under-Lyne
The Guardian journalists
Writers from Lancashire